The Fuerza Especial de Reacción (Special Reaction Force) or FER, previously known as GAFES del Alto Mando or Fuerza Especial del Alto Mando (High Command Special Force)   is one of Mexican Army's most elite special forces units. Their status comes mostly from their higher level training pedigree in black operations, clandestine operation, counterinsurgency, counter-narcotics, counterproliferation, counterterrorism, covert operation, direct action, executive protection, forward observer, hostage rescue, irregular warfare, long-range penetration, operation behind enemy lines, special operations, special reconnaissance, unconventional warfare, among other courses

Details of FER size, composition and operations are classified, though observers claim that in the current time Mexico's War on Drugs is their main operational focus. Members are recruited from the "regular" Mexican Army Special Forces Corps battalions. Prospective members must be experienced officers or non-commissioned officers and complete a rigorous selection process, and they can only get recruited through special invitation.  

The FER is one of four highly specialized elite groups within SEDENA's Special Forces Corps, as well as the only one of these four units whose existence is officially known to the public.

Known operations

Their first major engagements took place during the Zapatista uprising in the well known "Operación Arcoiris" (Operation Rainbow), where they employed counter insurgency tactics against the EZLN socialist guerrilla group, infiltrating and eliminating enemy targets in the jungle terrain of the southern state of Chiapas. 

One of the very first times its operators were seen in public was hours after the successful capture of Osiel Cárdenas Guillén as they arrived in Mexico City in 2003, during which they killed some of the elite personal security team of the drug lord; as the top leader of the Gulf Cartel at the time, Osiel was one of the most wanted men in Mexico and the United States

They were also responsible for hunting down almost all of the first generation of "Los Zetas”, (ex-GAFEs that deserted from the Mexican army to become security for the Gulf Cartel until they splintered to form their own organization) since they knew how they operated and how to counter them, it is mentioned that they located and then gunned down the first leader and co-founder of Los Zetas, Arturo Guzman Decena in the border city of Matamoros in 2002. These operations at the time, allowed the FER to enter into a very small list of special forces that had fought against other special forces (since the original Zetas were ex-GAFE).

Another known mission carried out by the FER was the capture of drug cartel leader Javier Torres Félix aka El J.T. in Culiacán, Sinaloa, January 27 of 2004. The commandos left Mexico City for Culiacán at 9:00 a.m. and returned with Félix at 6:00 p.m. that same day. Commanders had scheduled the arrest for another day but the Secretary told reporters that immediate capture was necessary. One of Félix's hitmen had killed a soldier from the Third Military Region while the soldier was on patrol at the outskirts of the town of El Tule. 

They carried out the capture of the second in command of the powerful Beltrán Leyva Cartel, Alfredo Beltrán Leyva aka. "El Mochomo, in Los Mochis, Sinaloa, year 2008.   

The FER was in charge of the raid that ended up with the assassination of one of the most famous Sinaloa Cartel leaders, Ignacio "Nacho" Coronel, the operation took place in the luxury suburb of Zapopan, Jalisco during the year 2010.   

The unit experienced its darkest day in 2015, during the failed Operation "Jalisco" in which an unsuccessful attempt was made to capture the supreme leader of the CJNG, Nemesio Oseguera Cervantes, aka "El Mencho"; In the course of the operation, a FAM EC725 Super Cougar helicopter that was transporting multiple FER operators was allegedly shot down by a Russian RPG rocket launcher, fired by El Mencho's elite security group (composed by former special forces of various countries), who managed to escape in the midst of the chaos of the situation; in this event, all FER operators who were onboard in the helicopter died. At their funeral, the Mexican High Command, the Secretaries of National Defense and the Navy, as well as the President of Mexico (at the time), Enrique Peña Nieto, could be seen attending the ceremony.    

In the same year of 2015, through detailed month surveillance they successfully located and captured the highly violent Los Zetas cartel leader, Omar Treviño Morales, in a luxury neighborhood in San Pedro Garza García, Nuevo León.

On August 2, 2020, José Antonio Yépez Ortiz (El Marro), main leader of the Santa Rosa de Lima Cartel (CSRL), was captured by the FER. Footage from the Federal AIC GEO and Guanajuato's own AIC State agents involved in the capture showcase alleged FER members in the operation.

They have been involved non-stop in many other captures and assassinations of cartel leaders, performing many clandestine operations and it's rumored that they have even operated in foreign soil in the Central American region where they have hunted down Zetas leaders in the past.  

One of FER's most recent interventions took place at dawn on January 5, 2023, where, in a joint-operation with the F.E. B.F.P., elements of the SEDENA Special Forces Corps and National Guard troops; assault teams of the FER and the F.E. B.F.P. were deployed to a ranch located in the community of Jesús María, Sinaloa, where they managed to recapture the well-known drug trafficker Ovidio Guzman Lopez, aka. "El Ratón" after wiping out his personal security group (Los Ninis) during fierce engagements, shortly after the capture there were multiple violent acts throughout the state of Sinaloa as a retaliation from the CDS, during the operation some FER operators were KIA.

References

Special forces of Mexico